Johannes Lid (11 January 1886 – 29 September 1971) was a Norwegian botanist. He was born in Voss, and he married the illustrator Dagny Tande Lid in 1936. He is particularly known for his works on Scandinavian flora, and for his widely used handbook to plants Norsk flora, with illustrations by his wife Dagny Tande Lid. He co-founded and chaired the Norwegian Botanical Association from 1935 to 1942. From 1948 onward he served as a curator at the Botanical Museum in Oslo. After his retirement in 1956, he carried out in-depth studies of the flora of the Canary Islands. He became a fellow of the Norwegian Academy of Science and Letters in 1945 and received the King's Medal of Merit in gold in 1956.

References

1886 births
1971 deaths
People from Voss
20th-century Norwegian botanists
Members of the Norwegian Academy of Science and Letters
Recipients of the King's Medal of Merit in gold